To create is to make a new person, place, thing, or phenomenon. The term and its variants may also refer to:
 Creativity, phenomenon whereby something new and valuable is created

Art, entertainment, and media
 Create (TV network), an American public television network consisting of lifestyle and human interest programming from the libraries of PBS and American Public Television
 Create (video game), a 2010 video game published by EA

Brands and enterprises
 Create (nightclub), an entertainment venue in Los Angeles

Computing and technology
 Chicago Region Environmental and Transportation Efficiency Program, a proposed improvement to the rail lines in the Chicago area
 Create, read, update and delete, create is one of the four basic functions of persistent storage identified in the acronym CRUD
 CREATE (SQL), a statement in SQL
 iRobot Create, a hobbyist robot based on the iRobot Roomba platform

Organizations and programs
 Create Project, a web-based community focused on communication and sharing between Free and Open Source Creative applications
 Create (charity), a UK creative arts charity

Transportation
 Chicago Region Environmental and Transportation Efficiency Program, a series of projects to improve rail lines in the Chicago area

See also
 Creation (disambiguation)